Man vs. Machine is the fourth studio album by American rapper Xzibit. It was released on October 1, 2002. Special guests include Dr. Dre, Snoop Dogg, Eminem, M.O.P, and Nate Dogg. Producers on the album include Rick Rock, Bink, Rockwilder, Erick Sermon, DJ Premier, and Dr. Dre (who was also the executive producer). The album debuted at number three on the Billboard 200 with over 156,000 copies sold in its first week. Since then album was certified gold by the Recording Industry Association of America (RIAA). It was the last album released by Loud Records before it went defunct the same year.

Music
The track "My Name" which features Eminem and Nate Dogg, is a diss track aimed at Canibus, Jermaine Dupri, and Moby.

Two of the songs from Man Vs. Machine were featured in the 2005 film Domino. The specific songs were "Choke Me, Spank Me (Pull My Hair)" as well as "The Gambler", which played during the film's opening credits.

Eminem's manager, Paul Rosenberg, makes a guest appearance on the album by performing a "Paul" skit (which is a skit that is commonly used for Eminem's studio albums).

Commercial performance
"Man vs. Machine" debuted at number three on the US Billboard 200 and number one on the US Top R&B/Hip-Hop Albums chart, selling 156,000 copies in its first week of release. The album spent a total of 19 weeks on the "Billboard" 200 chart. On November 12, 2002, the album was certified gold by the Recording Industry Association of America (RIAA) for sales of over 500,000 copies. It was certified shortly after a month of being released. As of November 2004, the album has sold 593,000 copies in the United States.

Reception
In a retrospective review, Mitch Findlay from HotNewHipHop said: "Once again executive produced by Dr. Dre, who provided production on two tracks and mixing engineer credits on seven, Man Vs. Machine emerged at the peak of Xzibit's musical popularity. His work on Restless had ushered him from an acclaimed underground presence to a household name, an equal affiliate to Snoop Dogg, Dre, Eminem, and his Golden State Project groupmates Ras Kass and Saafir. With Man Vs. Machine, Xzibit continued to build on the foundation of its predecessor, albeit with a slight gaze toward a more futuristic aesthetic; such qualities were largely realized by Rick Rock, who contributed production on tracks like "Symphony In X Major" and "Break Yourself.". He singled out songs like "Multiply", the Dre-produced songs "Losin Your Mind" and "Choke Me, Spank Me (Pull My Hair)", "BK To LA", "My Name" and "Harder" as highlists. He also said: "If there's anything keeping Man Vs. Machine from unmitigated greatness, it might very well be the inconsistent hooks. Slight blemishes aside, X's fourth studio album is an insanely listenable, crisply mixed, and nostalgic reminder of a classic musical era."

Track listing
Credits adapted from the album's liner notes.

Notes
 signifies a co-producer
 signifies an additional producer

Sample credits
 "Heart of Man" contains an interpolation of "Africa", written by David Paich and Jeff Porcaro.

Singles 

"My Name"

"Multiply"

"Symphony In X Major"

"Choke Me Spank Me (Pull My Hair)"

Charts

Weekly charts

Year-end charts

Certifications

References

External links 
 

2002 albums
Xzibit albums
Loud Records albums
Columbia Records albums
Albums produced by Dr. Dre
Albums produced by Rick Rock
Albums produced by Mr. Porter
Albums produced by Erick Sermon
Albums produced by Bink (record producer)
Albums produced by JellyRoll
Albums produced by Eminem
Albums produced by DJ Premier
Albums produced by Ty Fyffe